The 1998 World Single Distance Speed Skating Championships were held between 27 and 29 March 1998 in the Olympic Oval, Calgary, Canada.

Schedule

Medal summary

Men's events

Women's events

Medal table

References

1998 World Single Distance
World Single Distance Speed Skating Championships
World Single Distance, 1998
Sport in Calgary
World Single Distance Speed Skating Championships